Kathrien Plückhahn (born 14 September 1958) is a German rowing coxswain. She competed in the women's quadruple sculls event at the 1984 Summer Olympics.

References

1958 births
Living people
German female rowers
Olympic rowers of West Germany
Rowers at the 1984 Summer Olympics
Rowers from Berlin
Coxswains (rowing)